Arthur William (A. W.) Crawley-Boevey was a British author, barrister and civil servant, born on 12 August 1845 in London, UK. As an author, he is most known for his works on preservation of buildings and archeological sites in the British Empire including books on Flaxley Abbey. As a civil servant, he became the Acting Chief Presidency Magistrate of Bombay in 1887.

Career
Graduating from Oxford University with a Master of Arts, he became a practicing barrister with the Indian Civil Service between 1868 and 1893. During his time with the civil service held various magistrate and administrative positions in Rewa Kantha, Gujarat and Baroda. In 1887 he was appointed Acting Chief Presidency Magistrate of Bombay under Lord Reay.
He later became a Fellow at Bombay University, Bombay, India.

Works as an author
Crawley-Boevey published The Cartulary And Historical Notes Of The Cistercian Abbey Of Flaxley: Otherwise Called Dene Abbey in 1887. This is a collection of the records to titles, and history of the monastery and later Grade I estate of Flaxley Abbey. This book is considered to be culturally important as it is one of the rare cartularies of a religious abbey and manor house printed in the 19th century.

Other works by Crawley-Boevey include A Scheme for the Protection and Conservation of Antient Buildings in and Around the City of Ahmedabad and The Jerusalem Garden Tomb.

Family
Arthur William was the son of Sir Martin Hyde Crawley-Boevey, 4th Baronet. of Flaxley Abbey and Elizabeth Daubeny. He married Anna Maria Phayre, niece of the Governor of Mauritius, Lieutenant-General Sir Arthur Purves Phayre. They had one son, Major Martin Crawley-Boevey.

References

British people in colonial India
Indian Civil Service (British India) officers
1845 births
1913 deaths
People from Forest of Dean District
Alumni of Balliol College, Oxford
19th-century British civil servants
British barristers
19th-century British writers
People educated at Rugby School